Neospora hughesi is a species of Neospora.

References

Conoidasida